Cayetano is a Spanish and sometimes Sephardic Jewish name related to the Italian name Gaetano (English: Cajetan), both from Latin Caietanus, meaning "from Gaeta". It is a common given name in Spain, Mexico, Argentina and the Philippines. As a surname, it is also found predominantly in those countries, as well as Peru. The feminine version of the name is Cayetana.

People
Given name
 Saint Cajetan, Italian Catholic priest and religious reformer
 Cayetano (Giorgos Bratanis), Greek musician
 Cayetano Apablasa (1847–1889), American land owner and politician
 Cayetano Arellano (1847–1920), Chief Justice of the Supreme Court of the Philippines
 Cayetano Biondo (1902–1986), Argentine film actor
 Cayetano Carpio (1918–1983), leader of the Communist Party of El Salvador
 Cayetano Coll y Cuchí (1881–1961), Puerto Rican politician
 Cayetano Coll y Toste (1850–1930), Puerto Rican historian and writer
 Cayetano Cornet (b. 1963), Spanish athlete
 Cayetano Corona Gaspariano (fl. 1981), Mexican potter
 Cayetano Descalzi (1809–1886), Argentine painter of Italian origin
 Cayetano Garza (b. 1972), American comic artist
 Cayetano Santos Godino (1896–1944), Argentinian serial killer
 Cayetano Domingo Grossi (1854–1900), Argentine serial killer of Italian origin
 Cayetano Heredia (1797–1861), Peruvian physician
 Cayetano Hilario Abellán (1916–1997), Spanish sculptor 
 Cayetano María Huarte Ruiz de Briviesca (1741–1806), Spanish writer and poet
 Cayetano Antonio Licciardo (1923–1999), Argentine politician
 Antonio Cayetano March (b. 2000), Ecuadorian tennis player
 Cayetano Ordóñez (1904–1961), Spanish bullfighter
 Cayetano Pacana (fl. 1900), Filipino soldier and Mayor of Cagayan de Misamis
 Cayetano Paderanga Jr. (1948–2016), Filipino economist
 Cayetano Pignatelli, 3rd Marquis of Rubí (b. 1730), Spanish nobleman and military figure
 Cayetano Ré (1938–2013), Paraguayan footballer
 Cayetano Redondo Aceña (1885–1940), Spanish politician, journalist, Mayor of Madrid
 Cayetano Ripoll (1778–1826), Spanish schoolmaster executed for heresy
 Cayetano Rivera Ordóñez (b. 1977), Spanish bullfighter
 Cayetano José Rodríguez (1761–1823), Argentine cleric, journalist and poet
 Cayetano Santos Godino (1896–1944), Argentine serial killer
 Cayetano Saporiti (1887–1954), Uruguayan footballer
 Cayetano Sarmiento (b. 1987), Colombian road bicycle racer
 Cayetano Alberto Silva (1868–1920), Uruguayan musician and composer
 Cayetano Valdés y Flores (1767–1835), commander of the Spanish Navy

Surname
 Alan Peter Cayetano, Filipino politician and current speaker of the House of Representatives
 Ben Cayetano, governor of Hawaii
 Lani Cayetano, Filipino politician, wife of Alan Peter
 Lino Cayetano, Filipino politician, brother of Alan Peter and Pia, and current mayor of Taguig
 Pia Cayetano, Filipino politician, sister of Alan Peter and Lino
 Renato Cayetano, Filipino politician, father of Alan Peter, Lino, and Pia

See also
 Cayetano Germosén, town in the Dominican Republic
 Cayetano Heredia University, Peruvian University

References

Spanish masculine given names
Surnames of Spanish origin
Sephardic surnames